Anders Larsson (2 July 1892 – 4 January 1945) was a Swedish freestyle wrestler who won the gold medal in the light-heavyweight class at the 1920 Summer Olympics.

Larsson was nicknamed "Padd-Anders" for his large, paddle-like palms. He worked as a restaurant janitor and bouncer and consulted police forces on self-defense techniques. At the 1920 Olympics he rescued Köre Sörvik, a member of the Norwegian Olympic team, by stopping a man who tried to stab Sörvik with a knife in a dance club brawl.

References

External links
 

1892 births
1945 deaths
Olympic wrestlers of Sweden
Wrestlers at the 1920 Summer Olympics
Swedish male sport wrestlers
Olympic gold medalists for Sweden
Olympic medalists in wrestling
Medalists at the 1920 Summer Olympics
People from Varberg
Sportspeople from Halland County